Olivia Carnegie-Brown (born 28 March 1991 in Westminster, London) is a British rower.  She won a silver medal in the women's eight at the 2016 Summer Olympics.

Education 
She was educated at Queen Anne's School in Caversham, Berkshire and attended Oxford Brookes University. While at school at Caversham, Carnegie-Brown started her rowing career on GB Rowing Team's Start programme. For three years she trained under Eira Parry.

References

External links
 
 Profile on British Rowing

1991 births
Living people
English female rowers
British female rowers
Rowers from Greater London
Olympic rowers of Great Britain
Rowers at the 2016 Summer Olympics
Olympic silver medallists for Great Britain
Medalists at the 2016 Summer Olympics
Olympic medalists in rowing
Alumni of Oxford Brookes University
People educated at Queen Anne's School
European Rowing Championships medalists